The Australian Rules of Racing are the rules approved by the Australian Racing Board to ensure that thoroughbred horse racing in all States and Territories of Australia is conducted according to the same general practices, conditions and integrity. The Principal Racing Authority in each State or Territory also have a set of Local Rules which apply to all horse racing held in their jurisdiction.

Rules
The following is a list of the topics covered by the Australian Rules of Racing.
The complete Australian Rules of Racing, as of 1 August 2012 is available as an 85 page PDF file 

 Definitions AR.1
 Restricted races AR.1a
 Application of these rules AR.2 - 6
 Powers of a principal racing authority AR.7 - 7a
 Stewards AR.8 - 10a
 Registration of clubs and meetings AR.11 - 13
 Registration of horses AR.14 - 27
 Assumed names AR.28 - 31 (rescinded)
 Leases AR.32 - 34
 Race meetings AR.35 - 46b
 Nominations and entries AR.47 - 68a
 Syndicates AR.69 - 70
 Death of nominator AR.71
 Stakes and forfeits AR.72 - 74
 The forfeit list AR.75 - 77
 Sale with engagements AR.78 - 79
 Trainers AR.80 - 80e
 Jockeys and riders AR.81 - 91
 Apprentices allowances AR.92
 Stablehands and apprentices AR.93 - 96
 Retainers AR.97 - 100

 Amateurs AR.101 - 102
 Weights, penalties and allowances AR.103 - 113
 Scratching AR.114 - 117
 Weighing out AR.118 - 123
 Starting AR.124 - 134a
 Running AR.135 - 141b
 Weighing in AR.142 - 150
 Dead-heats AR.151 - 153
 Judge's decision AR.154 - 157
 Walk-over AR.158 - 160
 Course telecasts AR.160a - 160c
 Objections and complaints AR.161 - 174
 Offences AR.175 - 176
 Prohibited substances AR.177 - 178e
 Punishments AR.179 - 200
 Destruction of horse AR.201
 Notices AR.202 - 206
 Facsimile transmissions AR.207
 Australian racing board AR.208 - 214
 New rules AR.215

External links
 PDF file of Victoria Local Rules
 PDF file of Queensland Local Rules
 PDF file of W.A. Local Rules
 PDF file of NSW Local Rules
 PDF file of Northern Territory Local Rules
 NSW Horse welfare guidelines

Horse racing in Australia